Sedat Artuç (born 9 June 1976 in Oltu, Erzurum Province) is a Turkish European champion in weightlifting. He is winner of silver medal in World championship and of bronze medal at the 2004 Olympics.

Artuç, 1.63 m tall, is a member of EGO Sport Club in Ankara, Turkey. He is coached by Tuncer Şenses. 

In 2005, Artuç was banned from international competition by the International Weightlifting Federation for two years for doping.

Medals
Olympics 	

World Championships

European Championships

References

External links 
 

1976 births
Living people
People from Oltu
Turkish male weightlifters
Olympic bronze medalists for Turkey
Weightlifters at the 2004 Summer Olympics
Weightlifters at the 2008 Summer Olympics
Olympic weightlifters of Turkey
Olympic medalists in weightlifting
Doping cases in weightlifting
Turkish sportspeople in doping cases
European champions in weightlifting
Medalists at the 2004 Summer Olympics
European champions for Turkey
Mediterranean Games gold medalists for Turkey
Mediterranean Games silver medalists for Turkey
Competitors at the 2005 Mediterranean Games
Competitors at the 2009 Mediterranean Games
Mediterranean Games medalists in weightlifting
European Weightlifting Championships medalists
World Weightlifting Championships medalists
20th-century Turkish people
21st-century Turkish people